Brownbranch is an unincorporated community in northeastern Taney County, Missouri, United States.

Brownbranch had a post office from 1875 to 1962 (known as Brown Branch for the first 20 years). The community was named after the Brown family, which lived at a nearby creek.

References

Unincorporated communities in Taney County, Missouri
Branson, Missouri micropolitan area
Unincorporated communities in Missouri